William H. Colgan was an American catcher in Major League Baseball. He played for the 1884 Pittsburgh Alleghenys.

External links

SABR biography

1895 deaths
19th-century births
19th-century baseball players
Major League Baseball catchers
Pittsburgh Alleghenys players
Memphis Browns players
Kansas City Cowboys (minor league) players
Memphis Grays players
Milwaukee Brewers (minor league) players
St. Paul Freezers players
Evansville Hoosiers players
Walla Walla Walla Wallas players
Memphis Reds players
Baseball players from Illinois
Sportspeople from East St. Louis, Illinois